was a town located in Minamiuwa District, Ehime Prefecture, Japan.

As of 2003, the town had an estimated population of 4,204 and a density of 58.15 persons per km2. The total area was 72.29 km2.

On October 1, 2004, Ipponmatsu, along with the towns of Jōhen, Mishō and Nishiumi, and the village of Uchiumi (all from Minamiuwa District), was merged to create the town of Ainan.

External links
Official website of Ainan in Japanese

Dissolved municipalities of Ehime Prefecture
Ainan, Ehime